Mont Sângbé National Park (also spelled Mount Sangbé National Park, Sangbe Mountain National Park) is a national park in Ivory Coast. The Encyclopædia Britannica lists it among the "principal national parks of the world". It acquired national park status in 1976.

The National Park is located within the Monts du Toura, a range of mountains west of the Sassandra River. It covers an area of 95,000 ha (950 km2/360 sq m) north of Man, between Biankouma and Touba. The park consists of very densely vegetated savanna woodland with wildlife populations of elephants, buffaloes, warthog, antelopes and monkeys.

Description
Mont Sângbé National Park occupies a rugged terrain in the eastern end of the highland chain extending through Guinea and northern Liberia. The vegetation is mostly dense savanna woodland, with some small patches of deciduous forest, either as forest islands or as gallery forests. Two types of savanna are found in the southern part of the park. On well-drained soils grasses Brachiaria serrata and Andropogon macrophyllus dominate together with the principal tree species Daniella oliveri and Lophira lanceloata. On seasonally waterlogged soils there are few woody species and the grass Loudetia phragmitoides predominates. The northern parts are drier and support Sudanian woodland where the tree Isoberlinia doka is very abundant.

Wildlife
Mammal species of conservation concern include chimpanzee (Pan troglodytes verus), king colobus (Colobus polykomos), sooty mangabey (Cercocebus atys lunulatus), Diana monkey (Cercopithecus diana rolowayi), western palm squirrel (Epixerus ebi), African linsang (Poiana richardsoni liberiensis), African bush elephant (Loxodonta africana africana)), water chevrotain (Hyemoschus aquaticus), African buffalo (Syncerus caffer), bongo (Tragelaphus euryceros), Maxwell's duiker (Philantomba maxwellii), red-flanked duiker (Cephalophus rufilatus), black duiker (Cephalophus niger), yellow-backed duiker (Cephalophus silvicultor), bay duiker (Cephalophus dorsalis), royal antelope (Neotragus pygmaeus), oribi (Ourebia ourebi), bohor reedbuck (Redunca redunca), kob (Kobus kob kob), waterbuck (Kobus ellipsiprymnus defassa), western hartebeest (Alcelaphus buselaphus major), and roan antelope (Hippotragus equinus).

There are two crocodiles of conservation concern: slender-snouted crocodile (Mecistops cataphractus) and dwarf crocodile (Osteolaemus tetraspis). The bird fauna is incompletely surveyed but include species such as Baumann's olive greenbul (Phyllastrephus baumanni)) and emerald starling (Lamprotornis iris).

Great apes
Herbinger and Lia (unpublished, 2001) carried out a chimpanzee survey in Mont Sangbe National Park in May 2001, finding a population of 235–260 individuals in a survey area covering less than 5% of the park's total area, a population density of 5.7 chimpanzees per km².

References

External links
 Language, Gender and Sustainability Project Toura Map, accessed 25 December 2010.

National parks of Ivory Coast
Montagnes District
Protected areas established in 1976
1976 establishments in Ivory Coast